Poemander may refer to:

 Poimandres, a chapter in the Corpus Hermeticum
 Poemander (mythology), a character in Greek mythology